Kuranosuke (written: , ,  or ) is a masculine Japanese given name. Notable people with the name include:

, Japanese daimyō
, Japanese samurai
, Japanese Go player
, Imperial Japanese Navy admiral
, Japanese actor

Japanese masculine given names